In statistics, the Cochran–Mantel–Haenszel test (CMH) is a test used in the analysis of stratified or matched categorical data. It allows an investigator to test the association between a binary predictor or treatment and a binary outcome such as case or control status while taking into account the stratification. Unlike the McNemar test which can only handle pairs, the CMH test handles arbitrary strata size. It is named after William G. Cochran, Nathan Mantel and William Haenszel. Extensions of this test to a categorical response and/or to several groups are commonly called Cochran–Mantel–Haenszel statistics. It is often used in observational studies where random assignment of subjects to different treatments cannot be controlled, but confounding covariates can be measured.

Definition
We consider a binary outcome variable such as case status (e.g. lung cancer) and a binary predictor such as treatment status (e.g. smoking). The observations are grouped in strata. The stratified data are summarized in a series of 2 × 2 contingency tables, one for each stratum. The i-th such contingency table is:

The common odds-ratio of the K contingency tables is defined as:

The null hypothesis is that there is no association between the treatment and the outcome. The test statistic is:

It follows a  distribution asymptotically with 1 df under the null hypothesis.

Subset stability
The standard odds- or risk ratio of all strata could be calculated, giving risk ratios , where  is the number of strata. If the stratification were removed, there would be one aggregate risk ratio of the collapsed table; let this be .

One generally expects the risk of an event unconditional on the stratification to be bounded between the highest and lowest risk within the strata (or identically with odds ratios).
This is comparable but not identical to Simpson's paradox, and as with Simpson's paradox, it is difficult to interpret the statistic and decide policy based upon it.

Klemens
Then the CMH statistic is the unique well-behaved statistic satisfying subset stability.

Related tests
 The McNemar test can only handle pairs. The CMH test is a generalization of the McNemar test as their test statistics are identical when each stratum shows a pair.
 Conditional logistic regression is more general than the CMH test as it can handle continuous variable and perform multivariate analysis. When the CMH test can be applied, the CMH test statistic and the score test statistic of the conditional logistic regression are identical.
 Breslow-Day test for homogeneous association. The CMH test supposes that the effect of the treatment is homogeneous in all strata. The Breslow-Day test allows to test this assumption. This is not a concern if the strata are small e.g. pairs.

Notes

External links
 Introduction to the Cochran-Mantel-Haenszel Test

Statistical tests for contingency tables
Epidemiology
Medical statistics
Bayesian statistics
Summary statistics for contingency tables